Thirra or Theyyam thira is a ritual dance performed in "Kaavu"(grove)& temples of the Malabar region in Kerala State, South India.  This art form is performed by the artists of malaya (the artist who recognised for performing the art form called as a "perumalayan") community. This art is performed during Utsavam (annual temple festival). Clan deities such as Bhagavathi, Shiva are worshipped in these forms.Theyyam thira is  main sub division of Theyyam.  It is similar to the Theyyam dance performed in the same region, except that in Theyyam the performer is considered as the god he is representing, while in Thira the performer is considered as to be possessed by god.
 
Thira brings the gods to life. Performers dress up with ceremonial facial paint and loud clothing and dance in front of the deity, the bhagavathi. The objective clearly is to bring a sense of awe to the proceedings. Each performer represents a particular deity and is sponsored by devotees as a prayer offering. These dancers are viewed as being possessed by the gods when they are in their act, with devotees queuing up to meet them to share woes and wishes. 

Toddy plays a very significant role in the proceedings, it is an offering to the gods and almost all the performers dance under the influence. This helps in creating the feeling of being "possessed". Therefore in Kerala, both upper caste Brahmins, and lower caste tribals have an important place in worship.

Different types of Thiras
 Bhagavathi Thira
 Bhairavan Thira
 Chanthu Thira
 Gulikan Thira
 Kuttichathan Thira
 Hanuman Thira
 Pottan Thira
 Kandakarnan Thira
 Chamundi Thira
 Vasoorimala Thira
 NagaKali Thira
 Dharikavadham Thira
 Karinkali Thira
 Bhadrakaali Thira
 Raktheshwari Amma
 Ittikurumbha
 Odakkali

References

External links

 https://archive.today/20130704045059/http://www.malayalamresourcecentre.org/Mrc/culture/artforms/thirayaattam/main.html

Dances of Kerala
Ritual dances